Mame-Ibra Anne (born 7 November 1989 in Colombes) is a French sprinter specialising in the 400 metres. He won the bronze medal at the 2013 Mediterranean Games.

His personal bests in the event are 45.26 seconds outdoors (Cheboksary 2015) and 46.91 seconds indoors (Aubière 2013).

Competition record

References

1989 births
Living people
Sportspeople from Colombes
French male sprinters
World Athletics Championships athletes for France
Athletes (track and field) at the 2016 Summer Olympics
Olympic athletes of France
Mediterranean Games bronze medalists for France
Mediterranean Games medalists in athletics
Athletes (track and field) at the 2013 Mediterranean Games
20th-century French people
21st-century French people